Back to Mystery City is the fourth studio album by the Finnish rock band Hanoi Rocks, released in 1983. It was produced by ex-Mott the Hoople members Dale Griffin and Pete "Overend" Watts, and was the first with Razzle on drums. Besides Hanoi Rocks, the album also features keyboardist Morgan Fisher, and Miriam Stockley on backing vocals, who had also sung with Pink Floyd.

Song information 

"Strange Boys Play Weird Openings"
An acoustic intro that Andy McCoy came-up with in the studio.

"Malibu Beach Nightmare"

McCoy wrote song at home while smoking hashish. The song was originally recorded in 1981 as a calypso version titled "Malibu Nightmare". This version was just made as a joke but it was re-recorded for this album, as a more serious rock song. The song was also released as a single.

"Mental Beat"
The song is about speed, and was inspired by Michael Monroe's wild behavior as a child. This was also the only song that (according to Pete Watts) drummer Razzle had a hard time recording.

"Tooting Bec Wreck"
This song was inspired by a London apartment full of rats, in Tooting Bec, where Hanoi Rocks lived.

"Until I Get You"

Andy McCoy wrote this song at the band's manager Seppo Vesterinen's house in Helsinki. McCoy hated the song but Razzle loved it, and wanted it on their next record. Ultimately, McCoy also fell in love with the song. The song is also a great example of Hanoi Rocks' melodic glam rock-style. Also, the arrangement for the song was inspired by Alice Cooper's "I'm Eighteen". L.A. Guns covered the song on their 2004 album Rips the Covers Off.

"Sailing Down the Tears"
Written in 10 minutes, but the band still loved the song. The song was written as a mid-tempo, standard 70's rock-, pop-song.

"Lick Summer Love"
This song sparked some controversy when it was released. McCoy wrote the song when he was 17 years old. The song deals with making love and having oral sex with his girlfriend. Monroe has since said that he thinks the song is an "awful slime-ball", and that he hated the lyrics.

"Beating Gets Faster"
A love-song written by Monroe and McCoy.

"Ice Cream Summer"
A song dealing with a summer romance.

"Back to Mystery City"
At the time of its release, the song was very popular, but it has since been overshadowed by the many other Hanoi Rocks' hits. Andy McCoy wrote the song about Hanoi Rocks' adventures in the Far-East, the band's fans and the buzz that was also surrounding the band in 1983. The song is also composed in the same style as Tommy James and the Shondells' song "Mony Mony". The song's title was inspired by the London club Mystery City.

Critical reception 

In a contemporary review for The Village Voice, music critic Robert Christgau said that Monroe and McCoy lack hooks, are backed by "cute if over-calculated" dual guitar playing, and "yowl English-language lyrics that must impress Finns more than native speakers like myself."

In 2005, Back to Mystery City was ranked number 293 in Rock Hard magazine's book The 500 Greatest Rock & Metal Albums of All Time.

Back to Mystery City is also featured in the book 1001 Albums You Must Hear Before You Die.

Track listing

Personnel 
Hanoi Rocks
 Michael Monroe – lead vocals, saxophone, harmonica
 Andy McCoy – lead guitar
 Nasty Suicide – rhythm guitar
 Sam Yaffa – bass
 Razzle – drums
Additional personnel
 Morgan Fisher – keyboards
 Miriam Stockley – backing vocals

Production

Production personnel 
 Producers: Dale Griffin and Pete "Overend" Watts
 Engineer: Andy Lyden
 Arrangers: Michael Monroe and Andy McCoy

Other personnel 
 Cover photo: Fin Costello
 Layout: Hilary Goodwright

Remastering personnel 
 Digitally remastered: Mika Jussila
 Reissue sleeve and booklet: Jari Mattila

Chart positions

Album

Singles

References 

Hanoi Rocks albums
1983 albums